The Rashtriya Rifles (RR) is a counter-insurgency force in India, formed in 1990, to specifically serve in the Jammu and Kashmir region. They also maintain public order by drawing powers from the Armed Forces (Jammu and Kashmir) Special Powers Act, 1990 (AFSPA). The RR was raised by the Indian Army by reconstituting two corps (about 75,000 troops). Its personnel are provided by the Indian Army on deputation. The RR is commanded by an Additional Directorate General of Rashtriya Rifles (ADG RR).

Crest
The RR crest consists of the Ashoka Chakra and two crossed rifles with fixed bayonets. Beneath, in a banner, is emblazoned the RR's motto: Dridhta aur virta.

Organisation
The RR units come under five "Counter Insurgency Force" (CIF) HQs. Each CIF is responsible for an area of the Kashmir Valley and Jammu Division. 

 Counter Insurgency Force (CIF) R / Romeo Force – Rajouri and Poonch
 Counter Insurgency Force (CIF) D / Delta Force – Doda
 Counter Insurgency Force (CIF) V / Victor Force – Valley districts (Anantnag, Pulwama, Shopian, Kulgam and Budgam)
 Counter Insurgency Force (CIF) K / Kilo Force – Kupwara, Baramulla and Srinagar
 Counter Insurgency Force (CIF) U / Uniform Force – Udhampur and Banihal

Victor Force and Kilo Force come under the operational control of XV Corps. Delta Force, Romeo Force and Uniform Force come under the operational control of XVI Corps.

Operational sectors 
The areas covered by the Counter Insurgency Forces are themselves divided into sectors:
 Sector 1 – Anantnag district
 Sector 2 – Kulgam district
 Sector 3 – Manasbal Lake
 Sector 4 – Doda district
 Sector 5 – Baramulla district
 Sector 6 – Poonch district
 Sector 7 – Kupwara district
 Sector 8 – Kupwara district
 Sector 9 – Kishtwar district
 Sector 10 – Baramulla district
 Sector 11 – Banihal
 Sector 12 – Budgam district
 Sector 13 - Rajouri district
 Sector 14

Battalions 
RR comprises 65 battalions. Known RR battalion affiliations include:

1 RR – Mahar Regiment
2 RR – Sikh Light Infantry
3 RR – Jammu & Kashmir Rifles
4 RR – Bihar Regiment
5 RR – Jat Regiment
6 RR – Sikh Regiment
7 RR – Punjab Regiment
8 RR – Madras Regiment
9 RR – Rajputana Rifles
10 RR – Rajput Regiment
11 RR – Dogra Regiment
12 RR – The Grenadiers
13 RR – Kumaon Regiment
14 RR – Garhwal Rifles
15 RR – Gorkha Rifles
16 RR – Sikh Regiment
17 RR – Maratha Light Infantry
18 RR – Rajputana Rifles
19 RR – Sikh Light Infantry
20 RR – Dogra Regiment
21 RR – Brigade of the Guards
22 RR – Punjab Regiment
23 RR – Rajput Regiment
24 RR – Bihar Regiment
25 RR – Madras Regiment
26 RR – Kumaon Regiment
27 RR – Maratha Light Infantry
28 RR – Jammu & Kashmir Rifles
29 RR – The Grenadiers
30 RR – Mahar Regiment
31 RR (Commando) – Parachute Regiment
32 RR – Gorkha Rifles
33 RR – Gorkha Rifles
34 RR – Jat Regiment
35 RR – Assam Regiment
36 RR – Garhwal Rifles
37 RR – Punjab Regiment
38 RR – Madras Regiment
39 RR – The Grenadiers
40 RR – Dogra Regiment
41 RR – Maratha Light Infantry
42 RR – Assam Regiment
43 RR – Rajputana Rifles
44 RR – Rajput Regiment
45 RR – Jat Regiment
46 RR – Sikh Regiment
47 RR – Bihar Regiment
48 RR – Garhwal Rifles
49 RR – Sikh Light Infantry
50 RR – Kumaon Regiment
51 RR – Mahar Regiment
52 RR – Jammu & Kashmir Rifles
53 RR – Punjab Regiment
54 RR – Madras Regiment
55 RR – The Grenadiers
56 RR – Maratha Light Infantry
57 RR – Rajputana Rifles
58 RR – Rajput Regiment
59 RR – Assam Regiment
60 RR – Naga Regiment
61 RR – Jat Regiment
62 RR – Dogra Regiment
63 RR – Bihar Regiment

See also
 Assam Rifles

References

External links
 Rashtriya Rifles on GlobalSecurity.org

Paramilitary forces of India